George E. Hoyt (1861 – January 16, 1953) was a member of the Wisconsin State Assembly and the Wisconsin State Senate.

Biography
Hoyt was born in Menomonee Falls, Wisconsin in 1861. In 1892, he graduated from what was then known as the Northwestern University Medical School. He died at his home in Menomonee Falls on January 16, 1953.

Political career
Hoyt was elected to the Assembly in 1908. Later, he represented the 33rd District in the Senate during the 1911 and 1913 sessions. He was a Republican.

References

People from Menomonee Falls, Wisconsin
Republican Party Wisconsin state senators
Republican Party members of the Wisconsin State Assembly
Physicians from Wisconsin
Feinberg School of Medicine alumni
1861 births
1953 deaths